Ta Nea (Translation: The News) is a daily newspaper published in Athens. It was owned by Lambrakis Press Group (DOL), which also published the newspaper To Vima. The assets of DOL were acquired in 2017 by Alter Ego Media S.A.

The newspaper began publishing in 1931 under the title  (Athinaika Nea, Athens News), with the first issue being released on May 28. After the Axis occupation of Greece, it changed its name simply to "Ta Nea".

Ta Nea has been Greek's best-selling newspaper for decades, although the internet and the financial crisis have affected its circulation. The circulation peaked at around 200,000 copies in the  1990s, but by 2008,  circulation had declined by more than half of its peak. It is a traditional center-left friendly newspaper,  in the 1980s and 1990s strongly supporting the Panhellenic Socialist Movement (PASOK). Since 2017, it has adopted more centrist and right-wing views. Some of its prominent columnists include Yannis Pretenderis, Pavlos Tsimas and Stavros Theodorakis.

Ta Nea is also the name of a related Greek Australian newspaper produced in Melbourne by Greek Media Group.

See also
List of newspapers in Greece

References

External links
  
Ta Nea iPhone application (iTunes App Store link)

Publications established in 1931
1931 establishments in Greece
Newspapers published in Athens
Greek-language newspapers
Daily newspapers published in Greece